William Stephenson (1897–1989) was a Canadian-born British spy, potential inspiration for the character James Bond.

William Stephenson may also refer to:

 William Stephani (died 1428/9), or Stephenson, medieval bishop in Scotland
William Stephenson (biologist) (1916-1996), British/Australian marine biologist and academic
 William Stephenson (senior) (1763–1836), Geordie watchmaker, schoolteacher and songwriter
 William Stephenson (junior) (1797–1838), his  son, Geordie songwriter and printer
 William Stephenson (footballer) (1888–?), English footballer
 William Stephenson (sailor) (1889–1953), English marine engine stoker
 William Stephenson (psychologist) (1902–1989), psychologist and physicist best known for developing Q methodology
 Bill Stephenson (1937–2010), Australian rules footballer
 William B. Stephenson (died 1884), American politician and judge
 William Haswell Stephenson (1836-1918), English industrialist and philanthropist

See also 
 William Stevenson (disambiguation)